The Main was a 1691-ton, iron sailing ship built by Russel & Company for the Nourse Line and launched in August 1884. She is recorded as having completed the journey from Sharpness to Calcutta on 20 July 1900 in 100 days but was mainly used to transport Indian indentured labourers to the British colonies. Details of some of these are shown below:

The Main was sold to Norwegian owners in 1910-11 and renamed Vansa. She was dismasted on 8 December 1917 and sank 225nm ENE Cape Hatteras on 16 December 1917.

See also 
Indian Indenture Ships to Fiji
 Indians in Fiji
Indian indenture system

External links 
Indian Immigrant Ship List
Immigrant Ships Transcribers Guild

References 

Indian indenture ships to Fiji
Victorian-era passenger ships of the United Kingdom
Individual sailing vessels
1884 ships